Vincenzo Martinelli (20 June 1737 – 20 April 1807) was an Italian painter mainly painting landscapes both on canvas and fresco, mainly in his native Bologna.

Biography
He was prolific in Bologna. He worked also as a scenic designer. Among his frescoes are the stanzas painted alla boschereccia (forest style) located in the apartment of the Legate, now home to the Collezioni Comunali d'Arte. He collaborated with Giuseppe Jarmorini in painting frescoes in the Courtyard of the Palace once belonging to Bolognetti on via San Felice and the landscapes in the Allegory of Commerce (1793) painted with the collaboration of Filippo Pedrini in the Palazzo Pallavacini on the same street. He painted scenes in tempera at the Palazzo Bentivoglio di via Belle Arti.

He taught from 1767 to 1803 at the Accademia Clementina. He and some of his colleagues were excluded after 1804 from the reformed Accademia Nazionale delle Belle Arti.

As a scenic designer for Bolognese theaters, he also worked in a sphere that included Antonio Bibiena, Raimondo Compangnini, Vincenzo Mazza, Paolo Dardani, Gaetano Alemani, Vicenzo Conti, and Mauro Braccioli.

References

1737 births
1807 deaths
18th-century Italian painters
19th-century Italian painters
Italian male painters
Italian scenic designers
Painters from Bologna
Italian landscape painters
19th-century Italian male artists
18th-century Italian male artists